Han Do-woo (born Han Jong-young; September 23, 1996) is a South Korean actor. He is perhaps best known for his roles in the television series Make a Woman Cry (2015) and Our Gap-soon (2016–2017).

Filmography

Television series

References

External links
 
 

1996 births
Living people
South Korean male television actors
21st-century South Korean male actors